"About You" is a song recorded by Canadian country artist MacKenzie Porter. The track was co-written by Hardy, Sarah Buxton and Corey Crowder, with Cameron Montgomery, who co-produced it with Joey Moi and Dave Cohen. The song became the lead single off Porter's EP Drinkin' Songs: The Collection.

Critical reception
Kerry Doole of FYI Music News stated: "On this track, Porter displays a supple and convincing vocal style, while the lyrical content is subtly subversive". Top Country named the song "Pick of the Week" for April 16, 2019, saying "each listen feels like the first. Every time you hit repeat, there’s another layer of the song to discover. Perhaps it’s the subtle, yet clever, juxtaposition between the production and the story. One moment you’re swaying along and then the next, a heartbreaking lyric stops you in your tracks".

Commercial performance
"About You" reached a peak of #1 on the Billboard Canada Country chart dated May 25, 2019, becoming Porter's first number one. This made Porter the first female artist signed to an independent label to top the Canada Country chart in its 25 years of existence.

Music video
The official music video for "About You" premiered on ET Canada on March 8, 2019, and was directed by Justin Clough. Porter said: "The video for ‘About You’ came together exactly how I envisioned it — a little edgy and a little dark. Telling the story of love that is so passionate, yet so toxic". The video stars Porter and her real-life partner (and future husband) Jake Etheridge.

Charts

References

2018 songs
2018 singles
Big Loud singles
MacKenzie Porter songs
Songs written by Hardy (singer)
Songs written by Sarah Buxton
Song recordings produced by Joey Moi
Songs written by Corey Crowder (songwriter)